Shibo Avenue is the name of a station on Line 13 of the Shanghai Metro. It served as the eastern terminus of the line until 30 December 2018, when the extension of Line 13 to  opened.

The station has 3 tracks, one island platform, and one side platform. The inner island platform is not in service. Trains heading to Jinyun Road use the outer island platform, whilst trains towards Zhangjiang Road use the side platform.

References 

Railway stations in Shanghai
Line 13, Shanghai Metro
Shanghai Metro stations in Pudong
Railway stations in China opened in 2015